Krang Ponley River (Stoeng Krang Ponley, Stung Krang Ponley) is a river of Cambodia.

References

See also
List of rivers of Cambodia

Rivers of Cambodia